The Senusiyya, Senussi or Sanusi ( as-Sanūssiyya) are a Muslim political-religious tariqa (Sufi order) and clan in colonial Libya and the Sudan region founded in Mecca in 1837 by the Grand Senussi ( as-Sanūssiyy al-Kabīr), the Algerian Muhammad ibn Ali as-Senussi. Senussi was concerned with what he saw as both the decline of Islamic thought and spirituality and the weakening of Muslim political integrity.

The movement promoted strict adherence to Qur'an and Sunna, without partisanship to the traditional legal schools of thought. It also sought a reformation of Sufism, condemning various practices such as seeking help from the dead, sacrificing for them and other rituals which they considered to be superstitions and innovations.

From 1902 to 1913, the Senussi fought French colonial expansion in the Sahara and the Kingdom of Italy's colonisation of Libya beginning in 1911. In World War I, they fought the Senussi Campaign against the British in Egypt and Sudan. In 1923, indigenous rebels associated with the Senussi Order organized the Libyan resistance movement against Italian settlement in Libya. During World War II, the Senussis provided vital support to the British Eighth Army in North Africa against Nazi German and Fascist Italian forces. The Grand Senussi's grandson became King Idris of Libya in 1951. In 1969, Idris I was overthrown by a military coup led by Muammar Gaddafi. The movement remained active in spite of sustained persecution by Gaddafi's government. The Senussi spirit and legacy continue to be prominent in today's Libya, mostly in the east of the country.

Beginnings: 1787–1859

The Senussi order has been historically closed to Europeans and outsiders, leading reports of their beliefs and practices to vary immensely. Though it is possible to gain some insight from the lives of the Senussi sheikhs further details are difficult to obtain.

Muhammad ibn Ali as-Senussi (1787–1859), the founder of the order and a proponent of Sufism,  was born in Algeria near Mostaganem and was named al-Senussi after a venerated Muslim teacher. He was a member of the Walad Sidi Abdalla tribe, and was a sharif. In addition to Islamic sciences, Al-Senussi was taught science and chivalry in his upbringing. He studied at the University of al-Qarawiyyin in Fez, then traveled in the Sahara preaching a purifying reform of the faith in Tunisia and Tripoli, gaining many adherents, and then moved to Cairo to study at Al-Azhar University in 1824. Al-Senussi was critical of the government of Muhammad Ali Pasha. The pious scholar was forceful in his criticism of the Egyptian ulama for what he perceived as their timid compliance with the Ottoman authorities and their spiritual conservatism.  He also argued that learned Muslims should not blindly follow the four classical madhhabs (schools of law) but instead engage in ijtihad themselves.  Not surprisingly, he was opposed by the ulama as unorthodox and they issued a fatwa against him. He left Egypt for Mecca, where he spent 15 years as a student and teacher until 1843.

Senussi went to Mecca, where he joined Ahmad ibn Idris al-Fasi, the head of the Qadiriyya, a renowned religious fraternity. Senussi furthermore acquired several of his ideas while under his education from 1825-1827/28.On the death of al-Fasi, Senussi became head of one of the two branches into which the Qadiriyya divided, and in 1835 he founded his first monastery or zawiya, at Abu Qubays near Mecca.  After being forced to leave by the Wahhabis, he returned to Libya in 1843 where in the mountains near Sidi Rafaa' (Bayda) he built the Zawiya Bayda ("White Monastery"). There he was supported by the local tribes and the Sultan of Wadai and his connections extended across the Maghreb.

The Grand Senussi did not tolerate fanaticism and forbade the use of stimulants as well as voluntary poverty.  Lodge members were to eat and dress within the limits of Islamic law and, instead of depending on charity, were required to earn their living through work. He accepted neither the wholly intuitive ways described by some Sufi mystics nor the rationality of some of the orthodox ulama; rather, he attempted to achieve a middle path. The Bedouin tribes had shown no interest in the ecstatic practices of the Sufis that were gaining adherents in the towns, but they were attracted in great numbers to the Senussis. The relative austerity of the Senussi message was particularly suited to the character of the Cyrenaican Bedouins, whose way of life had not changed much in the centuries since the Arabs had first accepted the Islamic prophet Mohammad's teachings.

In 1855 Senussi moved farther from direct Ottoman surveillance to Jaghbub, a small oasis some 30 miles northwest of Siwa. He died in 1860, leaving two sons, Mahommed Sherif (1844–95) and Mohammed al-Mahdi, who succeeded him.

Developments since 1859
Sayyid Muhammad al-Mahdi bin Sayyid Muhammad as-Senussi (1845 – 30 May 1902) was fourteen when his father died, after which he was placed under the care of his father's friends Amran, Reefi, and others. At age 18 he left their care and moved to Fez to further his knowledge of the Qur'an and Sufism. 

The successors to the sultan of the Abu Qubays, Sultan Ali (1858–74) and Sultan Yusef (1874–98), continued to support the Senussi. Under al-Mahdi, the zawiyas of the order extended to Fez, Damascus, Constantinople, and India. In the Hejaz members of the order were numerous. In most of these countries, the Senussi wielded no more political power than other Muslim fraternities, but in the eastern Sahara and central Sudan, things were different. Mohammed al-Mahdi had the authority of a sovereign in a vast but almost empty desert. The string of oases leading from Siwa to Kufra, and Borkou were cultivated by the Senussis, and trade with Tripoli and Benghazi was encouraged.

Although named "al-Mahdi" by his father, Muhammad never claimed to be the actual Mahdi (Saviour). However, he was regarded as such by some of his followers. When Muhammad Ahmad proclaimed himself the actual Mahdi in 1881, Muhammad Idris decided to have nothing to do with him. Although Muhammad Ahmed wrote twice asking him to become one of his four great caliphs (leaders), he received no reply. In 1890, the Ansar (forces of Muhammad Ahmad al-Mahdi) advancing from Darfur were stopped on the frontier of the Wadai Empire, Sultan Yusuf proving firm in his adherence to the Senussi teachings.

Muhammed al-Mahdi's growing fame made the Ottoman regime uneasy and drew unwelcome attention. In most of Tripoli and Benghazi his authority was greater than that of the Ottoman governors. In 1889 the sheik was visited at Jaghbub by the pasha of Benghazi accompanied by Ottoman troops. This event showed the sheik the possibility of danger and led him to move his headquarters to Jof in the oases of Kufra in 1894, a place sufficiently remote to secure him from a sudden attack. However, the Ottoman Sultan Abdulhamid II clearly wanted to maintain positive relations because he sent his aide-de-camp Azmzade Sadik El Mueyyed to meet Sheikh Mohammed al-Mahdi al Senussi twice, once to Jaghbub in 1886 and once to Kufra in 1895. Azmzade Sadik El Mueyyed published his journals on these visits in his book titled Journey in the Grand Sahara of Africa in 1897.

The Senussi had Somali contacts in Berbera and consistently tried to rally Somalis to join their movement alongside their rivals, the Mahdists. Sultan Nur Ahmed Aman of the Habr Yunis himself a learned Sheikh regularly received Senussi emissaries and housed them. Sultan Nur would go on to play a critical role in the subsequent Somali Dervish Movement starting in 1899.

By this time a new danger to Senussi territories had arisen from the French colonial empire, who were advancing from the French Congo towards the western and southern borders the Wadai Empire. The Senussi kept them from advancing north of Chad.

Leadership of Ahmed Sharif as-Senussi

In 1902, Muhammad Idris died and was succeeded by his nephew, Ahmed Sharif as-Senussi, but his adherents in the deserts bordering Egypt maintained for years that Muhammad was not actually dead. The new head of the Senussi maintained the friendly relations of his predecessors with the Dud Murra of Wadai Sultan of the Wadai Empire, governing the order as regent for his young cousin, Muhammad Idris II (the future king Idris of Libya), who signed the 1917 Treaty of Acroma that ceded control of Libya from the Kingdom of Italy and was later recognized by them as Emir of Cyrenaica on October 25, 1920.

The Senussi, encouraged by the German and Ottoman Empires, played a minor part in the World War I, during the Senussi uprising, utilising guerrilla warfare against the Italian colonials in Libya and the British in Egypt from November 1915 until February 1917, led by Sayyid Ahmad, and in the Sudan from March to December 1916, led by Ali Dinar, the Sultan of Darfur. In 1916, the British sent an expeditionary force against them known as the Senussi Campaign led by Major General William Peyton. According to Wavell and McGuirk, Western Force was first led by General Wallace and later by General Hodgson.

Italy took Libya from the Ottomans in the Italo-Turkish War of 1911. In 1922, Italian Fascist leader Benito Mussolini launched his infamous Riconquista of Libya — the Roman Empire having done the original conquering 2000 years before. The Senussi led the resistance and Italians closed Senussi khanqahs, arrested sheikhs, and confiscated mosques and their land. The Senussi resistance was led by Omar Muktar who used his knowledge of desert warfare and guerrilla tactics to resist Italian colonization. After his death the Senussi resistance faded, and they were forced to renounce their land for compensation.  Overall, Libyans fought the Italians until 1943, with 250,000–300,000 of them dying in the process.

Idris of Libya
From 1917 to his death, in 1933, Ahmed Sharif as-Senussi's leadership was mostly nominal. Idris of Libya, a grandson of Muhammad ibn Ali al-Sanusi, the Grand Senussi, replaced Ahmed as effective leader of the Order in 1917 and went on to play a key role as the Senussi leader who brought the Libyan tribes together into a unified Libyan nation.

Idris established a tacit alliance with the British, which led to two agreements with the Italian rulers, one of which brought most of inland Cyrenaica under the de facto control of the Senussis. The resulting Accord of al-Rajma, consolidated through further negotiations with the Italians, earned Idris the title of Emir of Cyrenaica, albeit new tensions which compromised that delicate balance emerged shortly after.

Soon Cyrenaica became the stronghold of the Libyan and Senussi resistance to the Italian rulers. In 1922, Idris went into exile in Egypt, as the Italian response to the Libyan resistance grew increasingly violent.

In 1931 Idris married his first cousin Fatimah el-Sharif, a daughter of his predecessor Ahmed Sharif as-Senussi.

During the Second World War, Senussi groups led by Idris formally allied themselves with the British Eighth Army in North Africa against the German and Italian forces. Ultimately, the Senussis proved decisive in the British defeat of both Italy and Germany in North Africa in 1943. As the Senussi were leading the resistance, the Italians closed Senussi khanqahs, arrested sheikhs, and confiscated mosques and their land. The Libyans fought the Italians until 1943, with some 250,000 of them dying in the process.

As historian Ali Abdullah Ahmida remarked, the Senussi order was able to transcend "ethnic and local tribal identification", and therefore had a unifying influence on the Libyans fighting the Italian occupiers. A well-known hero of the Libyan resistance and an ally of Idris, Omar Mukhtar, was a prominent member of the Senussi order and a Sufi teacher whom the Italians executed in 1931.

After the end of the war in 1945, the Western powers pushed for Idris, still leader of the Senussi order, to be the leader of a new unified Libya. When the country achieved independence under the aegis of the United Nations in 1951, Idris became its king, and Fatimah his Queen consort.

Although it was instrumental in his accession to power, according to the Islamic scholar Mohammed Ayoob, Idris used Islam "as a shield to counter pressures generated by the more progressive circles in North Africa, especially from Egypt."

Resistance towars Idris' rule began to build in 1965 due to a combination of factors: the discovery of oil in the region, government corruption and ineptness, and Arab nationalism. On September 1, 1969, a military coup led by Muammar Gaddafi marked the end of Idris’ reign. The king was toppled while he was receiving medical treatment in Turkey. From there he fled to Greece and then Egypt, where he died in exile in 1983. Meanwhile, a republic was proclaimed, and Idris was sentenced to death in absentia in November 1971 by the Libyan People's Court.

In August 1969, Idris issued a letter of abdication designating his nephew Hassan as-Senussi as his successor. The letter was to be effective on September 2, but the coup preceded Idris’ formal abdication. King Idris’ nephew and Crown Prince Hasan as-Senussi, who had been designated Regent when Idris left Libya to seek medical treatment in 1969, became the successor to the leadership of the Senussi order.

Many Libyans continue to regard Idris with great affection, referring to him as the "Sufi King". In May 2013, Idris and Omar Mukhtar were commemorated for their role as Senussi leaders and key players in Libya's independence in a celebration of the 50th anniversary of the foundation of the African Union in Addis Ababa.

Developments since 1969
Gaddafi banned the Senussi order, forced the Senussi circles underground, and systematically persecuted prominent Senussi figures, in an effort to remove Sufi symbols and to silence voices of the Senussi tradition from Libya's public life. The remaining Senussi tribes were severely restricted in their actions by the revolutionary government, which also appointed a supervisor for their properties.
 
Ironically, Omar Mukhtar became one of Gaddafi's most inspiring figures, whose speeches he frequently quoted, and whose image he often exhibited in official occasions.
In 1984, Libya's distinguished Senussi University was closed by Gaddafi's order, although international scholars continued to visit the country until the beginning of the civil war to study the Senussi history and legacy. In fact, evidence of the Senussi presence and activism was recorded throughout the 1980s.
Vocal anti-Gaddafi resistance emerged among the former Senussi tribes in Cyrenaica in the 1990s, which Gaddafi violently suffocated with his troops. 
In 1992, Crown Prince Hasan as-Senussi died. The leadership of the Senussi order passed to his second son, Mohammed el Senussi, whom Hasan had appointed as his successor to the throne of Libya.

Enduring relevance of the Senussi Order
The Sufi heritage and spirit remains prominent today, and its sentiment and symbols have inspired many during the 2011 revolution. The image of Omar Mukhtar and his popular quote "We win or we die" resonated in Tripoli and in the country as Libyans rose up to oust Gaddafi. In July 2011 The Globe and Mail contributor Graeme Smith reported that one of the anti-Gaddafi brigades took the name of "Omar Mukhtar Brigade".

Stephen Schwarz, executive director of the Center for Islamic Pluralism, reflected on the "Sufi foundation" of Libya's revolution in his August 2011 piece for the Huffington Post. Schwarz observed that Libya continued to stand "as one of the distinguished centers of a Sufism opposed both to unquestioning acceptance of Islamic law and to scriptural absolutism, and dedicated to freedom and progress." He wrote: "With the fall of the dictatorship, it will now be necessary to analyze whether and how Libya's Sufi past can positively influence its future."

In August 2012, hardline Salafi extremists attacked and destroyed the shrine of al-Shaab al-Dahmani, a Sufi saint, in Tripoli. The tombs of Sufi scholars were systematically targeted by extremists as well.

The sustained attacks were consistently denounced by Sufi scholars as well as by the League of Libyan Ulema, a group of leading Libyan religious scholars, calling the population to protect the religious and historical sites "by force" and urging the authorities to intervene in order to avoid further escalations of violence and new attacks by Salafi groups.

Chiefs of the Senussi Order 

 Muhammad ibn Ali as-Senussi (1843–1859)
 Muhammad al-Mahdi as-Senussi (1859–1902)
 Ahmed Sharif as-Senussi (1902–1916; died 1933)
 Idris of Libya (1916–1969; died 1983)
 Hasan as-Senussi (1969–1992)
 Mohammed El Senussi (1992–present)

Senussi family tree

See also

 Sufism
 List of Sufi orders
 Senussi Campaign in World War I
 Ahmad ibn Idris al-Fasi
 Idris bin Abdullah al-Senussi
 Ahmed al-Senussi
 Abdullah Senussi
 Omar Mukhtar
 Charles de Foucauld

Notes

Sources
 Azmzade Sadik El Mueyyed, Journey in the Grand Sahara of Africa (1897), republished in Azmzade, Gokkent, Senusi et al. in Journey in the Grand Sahara of Africa and Through Time (2021)
 E. E. Evans-Pritchard, The Sanusi of Cyrenaica (1949, repr. 1963)
 N. A. Ziadeh, Sanusiyah (1958, repr. 1983).
 Bianci, Steven, ''Libya: Current Issues and Historical Background New York: Nova Science Publishers, INc, 2003
 L. Rinn, Marabouts et Khouan, a good historical account up to the year 1884
 O. Depont and X. Coppolani, Les Confréries religieuses musulmanes (Algiers, 1897)
 Si Mohammed el Hechaish, Chez les Senoussia et les Touareg, in "L'Expansion col. française" for 1900 and the "Revue de Paris" for 1901. These are translations from the Arabic of an educated Mahommedan who visited the chief Senussite centres. An obituary notice of Senussi el Mahdi by the same writer appeared in the Arab journal El Hadira of Tunis, Sept. 2, 1902; a condensation of this article appears in the "Bull. du Com. de l'Afriue française" for 1902; "Les Senoussia", an anonymous contribution to the April supplement of the same volume, is a judicious summary of events, a short bibliography being added; Capt. Julien, in "Le Dar Ouadai" published in the same Bulletin (vol. for 1904), traces the connection between Wadai and the Senussi
 L. G. Binger, in Le Péril de l'Islam in the 1906 volume of the Bulletin, discusses the position and prospects of the Senussite and other Islamic sects in North Africa. Von Grunau, in "Verhandlungen der Gesellschaft für Erdkunde" for 1899, gives an account of his visit to Siwa
 M. G. E. Bowman–Manifold, An Outline of the Egyptian and Palestine Campaigns, 1914 to 1918 2nd Edition (Chatham: The Institution of Royal Engineers, W. & J. Mackay & Co Ltd, 1923)
 Russell McGuirk The Sanusi's Little War The Amazing Story of a Forgotten Conflict in the Western Desert, 1915–1917 (London, Arabian Publishing: 2007)
 Field Marshal Earl Wavell, The Palestine Campaigns 3rd Edition thirteenth Printing; Series: A Short History of the British Army 4th Edition by Major E.W. Sheppard (London: Constable & Co., 1968)
 Sir F. R. Wingate, in Mahdiism and the Egyptian Sudan (London, 1891) narrates the efforts made by the Mahdi Mahommed Ahmed to obtain the support of the Senussi
 Sir W. Wallace, in his report to the Colonial Office on Northern Nigeria for 1906–1907, deals with Senussiism in that country.
 H. Duveyrier, La Confrérie musulmane de Sidi Mohammed ben Ali es Senoûssi (Paris, 1884), a book containing much exaggeration.
 A. Silva White, From Sphinx to Oracle (London, 1898), which, while repeating the extreme views of Duveyrier, contains useful information.

External links 
 

 
1837 establishments in Africa
African resistance to colonialism
Arab dynasties
Hashemite people in Sudan
Sunni Sufi orders